The Valentine Theatre is located in the downtown district of Toledo, Ohio at the corner of Superior and Adams Streets. The -year-old facility seats 901.

From 1925 to approximately 1928 The Toledo Society for the Blind (Now the Sight Center of Northwest Ohio) rented space there for their operations. It was there that a piano and victrola were donated and they were able to start a dancing class.

The building was added to the National Register of Historic Places on May 19, 1987.  A $28 million renovation of the building carried out by architect Charles H. Stark, begun in 1978 and taking 21 years to complete, was unveiled on October 9, 1999.

On November 23, 2007, a natural gas explosion in the basement caused extensive damage and forced the evacuation of the adjoining Renaissance Senior Apartments. The theater reopened in April 2008 after repairs costing $3.5 million.

Groups in residence
Toledo Symphony Orchestra
Toledo Opera
Toledo Ballet
Toledo Jazz Society
Toledo Jazz Orchestra
Toledo Masterworks Chorale
Toledo Repertory Theatre

References

External links

Buildings and structures in Toledo, Ohio
Theatres completed in 1895
Tourist attractions in Toledo, Ohio
National Register of Historic Places in Lucas County, Ohio
Culture of Toledo, Ohio
Theatres on the National Register of Historic Places in Ohio
1895 establishments in Ohio